Aftermath of the Lowdown is the third solo studio album by Richie Sambora which was released in Japan on September 12, 2012, in the United Kingdom on September 17, and in the United States on September 18, 2012 as digital download and on September 25, 2012 as physical CD (digisleeve format). For the first time in his 30-year career, Sambora signed with an independent label, Dangerbird.

Release and promotion
To promote the album, Sambora and his band appeared as the house band on The Late Late Show with Craig Ferguson for the first week in December 2012.

The album charted at No. 10 on the Top Hard Rock Albums chart, No. 34 on the Top Independent Albums chart, No. 149 on the Billboard 200 and No. 35 on the UK Albums Chart.

The track "Every Road Leads Home to You" was released as a single for the album and features a music video. The song is also featured as one of the bonus tracks on Bon Jovi's 2013 album What About Now. A special edition single, "I'll Always Walk Beside You'" featuring Alicia Keys was released as the second single of the album. All the profits from the sale of the special edition single goes to the ongoing recovery efforts of The Red Cross for the devastation from Hurricane Sandy. The track "Sugar Daddy" was released as a promo single and a music video was made for the song "Taking a Chance on the Wind".

A song named "Forgiveness Street" was thought to be planned as a bonus track on the Japan CD, but was later dropped.

Editions 
The worldwide version of the album features 11 tracks and the Japanese version features 12 tracks including "Backseat Driver" as a bonus track. There were 6 special packages for sale on Richie's official website:

 the physical digisleeve CD and the digital download; 
 the physical digisleeve CD, the digital download, a Richie's T-shirt and a limited edition autographed lithography; 
 a zip up hoodie, the physical digisleeve CD, the digital download and a limited edition autographed lithography; 
 the Limited Edition Deluxe Box Set which features a 13 3/4" x 12 1/2" bonded leather smith sewn book with an embossed Richie Sambora image on the cover along with a 2 color foil stamp of Richie's custom guitar strap, the entire record over 3 sides of 180 gram vinyl with the 4th side featuring an etching of the Richie Sambora silhouette, the compact disc, 16 pages of photography from famed photographer James Minchin as well as an autographed lithograph taken from those sessions and a Richie's T-shirt;
 the Limited Edition Deluxe Box Set which features a 13 3/4" x 12 1/2" bonded leather smith sewn book with an embossed Richie Sambora image on the cover along with a 2 color foil stamp of Richie's custom guitar strap, the entire record over 3 sides of 180 gram vinyl with the 4th side featuring an etching of the Richie Sambora silhouette, the compact disc, 16 pages of photography from famed photographer James Minchin as well as an autographed lithograph taken from those sessions, in addition to the box set this bundle includes the Richie Sambora zip up hoodie.

Track listing
From Dangerbird records.

Personnel
 Richie Sambora – vocals, lead guitar, acoustic guitar
 Aaron Sterling - drums
 Matt Rollings - piano, organ
 Curt Schneider - bass
 Rusty Anderson - rhythm guitar
 Roger Joseph Manning, Jr. - keyboards
 Luke Ebbin - background vocals, programming and keyboards

Charts

References

2012 albums
Richie Sambora albums
Albums produced by Luke Ebbin
Dangerbird Records albums